The Gold Medal Collection is a 1988 two-CD compilation album featuring various songs and interviews by singer-songwriter Harry Chapin. It was released by Elektra Records to commemorate Chapin for being posthumously awarded the Congressional Gold Medal for his humanitarian work and campaigns to end hunger. The album has been certified platinum by the RIAA and has sold over 1 million copies.

Track listing
Disc 1 (1:08:22):
"Taxi" - 6:44
"Sunday Morning Sunshine" - 3:30
"Old College Avenue" - 4:25
"Dirty Old Man" - 1:25
"I Wanna Learn a Love Song" - 4:19
"Cat's in the Cradle" - 3:44
"Tangled Up Puppet" - 3:42
"Dancing Boy" - 3:40
"Thanksgiving Hunger Drives" - 0:47
"Flowers Are Red (Live)" - 5:01
"She Sings Songs Without Words" - 3:31
"Shooting Star" - 4:02
"Winter Song" - 2:30
"Story of a Life" - 5:15
"Commitment and Pete Seeger" - 1:47
"There Only Was One Choice" - 14:00
Disc 2 (1:11:51):
"A Better Place to Be" - 7:35
"Mail Order Annie" - 4:52
"Performing" - 0:30
"W*O*L*D (Live)" - 4:46
"Mr. Tanner (Live)" - 4:45
"Corey's Coming" - 5:38
"A Child Is Born" - 0:30
"Sniper" - 9:50
"Calluses" - 0:41
"The Rock" - 4:15
"Dance Band on the Titanic" - 5:11
"I Wonder What Would Happen to This World" - 3:28
"Sequel" - 6:35
"My Grandfather" - 1:45
"Remember When the Music (Reprise)" - 3:50
"Circle (Live)" - 7:30

References

1988 compilation albums
Harry Chapin albums
Compilation albums published posthumously
Elektra Records compilation albums